Haafeva is a small island in the Haʻapai group of Tonga, but still the main island of the Lulunga archipelago. Kolongatata is the name commonly given to the village on Haafeva and is a reference to Haafeva's exposure to strong winds. The inhabited area of Haafeva can be divided into Hahake, Hihifo, Tua Kolo, Loto Kolo and Uta. The Island has a population of 192.

Geography
Haafeva is 42 km southwest of Pangai in the Haapai group of islands at Latitude (DMS) 19° 56' 60 S and Longitude (DMS) 174° 43' 0 W.

History
Haʻafeva is the home estate of the chiefly line of Tuuhetoka (now merged with Lasike). It was Moatunu, one of their ancestors, who once saved Tāufaāhau I from losing a decisive battle and even death at the 1826 Battle of Velata. When Tāufaāhau came to Haafeva to ask the chief for help with his war against Laufilitonga, the last Tui Tonga to be, the chief did not want to help him, having his allegiance with the other. But when his sister threatened to go instead, he switched loyalty, and fought close to Tāufaāhau. Then the latter was hit on the head by several attackers and lay unconscious on the ground. The Haafeva chief fought off all enemies until Tāufaāhau became conscious again. Later this warrior was named "Tuu-he-toka" ("Standing while the chief is sleeping"). Had Tāufaāhau been a commoner instead of a chief, the proper term would be tuu-he-mohe; had he been king, tuu-he-tōfā would have been used.

The area around the island was also the site of the 1789 Mutiny on the Bounty.

Archaeology
Haafeva is home to an excavation site dubbed 'Mele Havea', after Mele Havea, whose house is nearby. Hundreds of pieces of early Eastern Lapita pottery were unearthed there in 1996 and 1997 along with various other artifacts of early settlements. Carbon dating places these artifacts at approximately 2690 to 2490 years BP.

Ferry sinking
Haafeva was to have been the destination of the ill-fated , an inter-island ferry that sank on 5 August 2009, claiming many lives. Most of those killed were women and children as it is usual in Tonga for men to sleep on the decks of boats while the children and women shelter inside.

References

Islands of Tonga
History of Tonga
Haʻapai